Armouries Square is a large public square in central Leeds, West Yorkshire, United Kingdom, adjacent to the Royal Armouries Museum, after which it is named.

It was opened as part of a regeneration project which sought to update the area around Leeds Dock with the square being a hard-standing display area for displays by the Royal Armouries Museum.

References

Squares in Leeds